Hopalong Cassidy Returns (1936) is a Western film sequel starring William Boyd, the seventh of the "Hopalong Cassidy" westerns.

This was the first of 13 Hopalong Cassidy movies in which Morris Ankrum starred with William Boyd. He also was in two Hopalong Cassidy TV productions, Black Waters (1952) and The Black Sombrero (1954).

Plot
Town marshal Hopalong Cassidy investigates the murder of a gold miner who was killed before he could file his claim.

Cast
 William Boyd as Hopalong Cassidy
 George 'Gabby' Hayes as Windy Haliday 
 Gail Sheridan as Mary Saunders
 Evelyn Brent as Lilli Marsh
 Morris Ankrum as Blackie Felton
 William Janney as Buddy Cassidy
 Irving Bacon as Peg Leg Holden

Reception
This is the highest-rated film in the Hopalong Cassidy series starring Boyd on the IMDb website.

References

External links
 
 
 
 

1936 films
1936 Western (genre) films
American black-and-white films
Films based on American novels
Films directed by Nate Watt
American Western (genre) films
Hopalong Cassidy films
1930s English-language films
1930s American films